"Right on the Money" is a song written by Phil Vassar and Charlie Black, and recorded by American country music singer Alan Jackson.  It was  released in October 1998 as the second single from his CD High Mileage.  The song became Jackson's sixteenth number-one single on the Hot Country Singles & Tracks (now Hot Country Songs) chart.

Composition
The song is in the key of E-flat major. Jackson's vocals range from B♭3 to E♭5. The main chord progression in the verses is E♭-Edim-Fm7-B♭7 three times, followed by A♭ and B♭ for a measure each.

Chart positions
"Right on the Money" debuted at number 75 on the U.S. Billboard Hot Country Singles & Tracks for the week of October 17, 1998.

Year-end charts

References

1998 singles
1998 songs
Alan Jackson songs
Songs written by Phil Vassar
Song recordings produced by Keith Stegall
Arista Nashville singles
Songs written by Charlie Black